Aotearapa is a New Zealand-based amateur press association, run in association with New Zealand science fiction fandom. It caters primarily - but not exclusively - to science fiction fans. Founded by Greg Hills in 1979, it is New Zealand's only apa, and that country's longest-running science fiction-related publication. Members have mostly been from New Zealand, although there have been members in the United States, Australia, and the United Kingdom.

Published bi-monthly, Aotearapa had its heyday in the early 1990s, at which time it would often exceed 180 pages. In decline in recent years, Aotearapa ran for 167 issues before going into hiatus in July 2007.

In January 2008 Aotearapa mailing 168 re-emerged in different format, with bi-monthly electronic mailings of pdf and text files replacing the traditional paper and postage format.

Editors
1979-1980: Greg Hills
1980-1983: Tom Cardy
1984-1985: Julie Stigter
1986-1987: Dan McCarthy
1988-1990: Keith Smith
1990-1993: James Dignan
1993-1995: Murray MacLachlan
1995-1997: Tim Jones
1997-2001: Simon Greenfield
2001-2003: Dan McCarthy
2003-2007: Nicholas Smeaton
2008- : Rex Thompson

References

External links 
Official website

1979 establishments in New Zealand
Magazines established in 1979
Speculative fiction magazines published in New Zealand
New Zealand science fiction
Science fiction organizations